BiblioTech was the first all-digital public library in the United States when it opened in 2013. It serves residents of Bexar County, Texas. There are three BiblioTech branches and one satellite branch.

History
The first BiblioTech location opened on September 14, 2013. The County-operated library cost $2.3 million (USD) and is located on the underserved south side of San Antonio. San Antonio is the second largest city in Texas and the seventh largest city in the U.S., but ranks 60th in literacy. The library had over 400,000 visitors in its first four years.

BiblioTech's second branch, the Dr. Richard Romo BiblioTech, opened in July 2015 on the west side of San Antonio; it also serves the residents of Bexar County. A third branch, on the city's east side, opened in April 2018.

Offerings
The library lends e-readers and digital content rather than physical media. BiblioTech lends e-readers to those with a BiblioTech card; about half of the e-readers are on loan at any given time.  Each e-reader can hold up to five books. Members with a library card can also download the cloudLibrary app to read eBooks from their personal device (iOS, Android, Windows).

BiblioTech also offers online databases and educational resources, programming, and many touch-screen video tablets with interactive Kaplan Early Learning Company educational games.

List of databases
The library arranges for its patrons access to digital content from several providers. Some resources are free of charge to the library, and some require paid subscriptions.

Comparison to traditional libraries
All-digital libraries have existed on college campuses for years, but this is the first all-digital public library. Head librarian Ashley Eklof says that in her former librarian job at a traditional library, items would get misplaced, vandalized, and go missing altogether, but she hasn't had any problems with e-readers disappearing.   The county also saved millions on some expenses, the architecture, and furniture required to store books, as well as the infrastructure to bear the weight of the books.  The volumes they offer cost about the same as the physical books.

Some readers prefer nondigital libraries. For critic Jeff Jacoby BiblioTech's all-digital library model lacks sensory enticements (such as shelves of books) that he believes foster serendipity in information discovery. He also notes the efficiency of printed books and appropriate delivery systems (such as Biblioburro) in some nonurban locales.

References

External links

County library systems in Texas
Libraries in San Antonio
2013 establishments in Texas